Yew Hill-Robert Ashby's Tavern-Shacklett's Tavern, known before 1760 as "Watts" or "Watts Ordinary", is a historic inn and tavern located near Delaplane, Fauquier County, Virginia. The main house was built about 1760–1761, and is a 1 1/2-story, three bay, Colonial-era frame structure. It sits on a stone foundation and features a jerkin-head gable roof. Also on the property are the contributing meat house, built about 1760–1817; barn (1798–1799, 1857); and spring house ruin (c. 1800). The building housed an ordinary from the time of its construction until 1879.

It was listed on the National Register of Historic Places in 2005.

References

Drinking establishments on the National Register of Historic Places in Virginia
Colonial architecture in Virginia
Houses completed in 1761
Houses in Fauquier County, Virginia
National Register of Historic Places in Fauquier County, Virginia